Marcos Johan López Lanfranco  (born 2 November 1999) is a Peruvian professional footballer who plays for Eredivisie club Feyenoord and the Peru national team.

Club career
In January 2019, López signed with San Jose Earthquakes.

On 8 August 2022, Feyenoord announced that it had signed López on a four year contract. He made his debut for the club on 11 August 2022 in a 3–0 win over Sparta Rotterdam.

International career
On 17 August 2018 he was called up by Ricardo Gareca to the full Peru international squad for friendly matches against Germany and Holland. He made his Peru debut entering the field as a substitute for Edison Flores in the 67th minute against Germany on 9 September 2018 at the Rhein-Neckar-Arena.

References

1999 births
Living people
Association football defenders
Major League Soccer players
Peru international footballers
Peruvian footballers
Reno 1868 FC players
San Jose Earthquakes players
USL Championship players
2021 Copa América players
Peru under-20 international footballers